The  was an earthquake that occurred in Iwate Prefecture, Japan on July 23, 2008. The earthquake's moment magnitude was 6.8 and it occurred at a depth of 115 km. Since this earthquake was an intermediate-focus earthquake, the shaking of the earthquake was observed over a wide range. It had a maximum JMA intensity of Shindo 6− (Aomori and Iwate).

Earthquake
Earthquakes within the subducting slabs are intraslab events; other intraslab earthquakes including those occurring in 1987, 1993, 2001 and 2003 have been damaging. Although occurring deeper in Earth's interior, these events can produce large ground motions. In the case of this earthquake, the recorded peak ground acceleration exceeded 1,000 cm/sec2, corresponding to IX (Violent) on the Mercalli intensity scale. A seismic inversion study suggest the earthquake ruptured two fault segments; the northern segment measuring  × , and the southern segment measuring  × .

Casualties
The earthquake left one person dead, a 64 year old woman in Iwaki which suffered severe wounds after falling from her bed due to the shaking, and 211 others were injured.

See also 
List of earthquakes in 2008
List of earthquakes in Japan
2008 Iwate-Miyagi Nairiku earthquake - similarly sized but unrelated earthquake that affected the same area the month prior.

References

External links 

 M6.8 - eastern Honshu, Japan - USGS
 岩手県沿岸北部を震源とする地震について - 内閣府

2008 earthquakes
July 2008 events in Japan
Earthquakes of the Heisei period
2008 disasters in Japan